Everything I Need is the second extended play by Holly Starr. Artist Garden Entertainment alongside New Day Records will be releasing the album on September 18, 2015. Starr worked with Ed Cash and Scott Cash, in the production of this EP.

Critical reception

Awarding the EP four stars from CCM Magazine, Andy Argyrakis states, "Holly Starr is clearly ahead of the curve throughout this latest melodic pop/contemporary Christian collection." Kevin Davis, giving the EP four stars at New Release Today, writes, "Everything I Need is a worshipful offering with compelling music and lyrics and stellar singing. Rating the EP four stars for 365 Days of Inspiring Media, Jonathan Andre says, "Everything I Need is Holly’s most poignant and compelling collection of songs I’ve heard thus far." Grace Thorson, indicating in a three star review by CM Addict, describes, "'Everything I Need' is a decent new project by Holly."

Track listing

References

2015 EPs